The Olympic field hockey tournament at the 1996 Summer Olympics in Atlanta, United States, was held in Herndon Stadium and Panther Stadium from July 20 to August 2, 1996.

Men's tournament

Women's tournament

References

External links

 

 
1996 Summer Olympics events
O
Field hockey at the Summer Olympics
1996